Monessen is a city in Westmoreland County, Pennsylvania, United States, along the Monongahela River. The population was 6,876 at the 2020 census. It is the southwestern-most municipality of Westmoreland County. Steel-making was a prominent industry in Monessen, which was a Rust Belt borough in the "Mon Valley" of southwestern Pennsylvania that became a third-class city in 1921. Monessen is part of the Pittsburgh metropolitan area, the Rivers of Steel National Heritage Area, as well as the Laurel Highlands.

History
Monessen, named for the Monongahela River and the industrial German city of Essen, was created by land speculators fairly late in the history of the Mon Valley, after neighboring towns had already been settled.  The East Side Land Company bought land from various farmers, laid out the streets, and then sold the lots to prospective residents and employers. James M. Schoonmaker, who had made his fortune in coke, owned a controlling interest in the land company. Other investors in the land company who were also immortalized in street names include Philander C. Knox, James H. Reed, H. Sellers McKee, George O. Morgan, and George B. Motheral. In May 1897, National Tin Plate Company, founded by William Donner, began building its mill, thus becoming Monessen's first employer. Sales of lots began on July 27, 1897, for the general public and other employers. Monessen became a borough on September 3, 1898.

Monessen experienced rapid growth in the first two decades of the twentieth century, the population increasing from 2,197 in 1900 to 11,775 in 1910 and then to 18,179 in 1920.

While there were many companies operating in Monessen, the largest employer was Pittsburgh Steel Company, later renamed Wheeling-Pittsburgh Steel.  In a practice that is shocking by today's standards (and not limited to Monessen), pay was determined by ethnic background. For example, a Welsh immigrant would be paid more than an Italian immigrant. A normal workweek was 84 hours (7 days times 12 hours). Employers did not adopt the eight-hour workday until the 1920s.

Monessen's status changed from "borough" to "city" on September 16, 1921.

Beginning in the middle to late 1960s, the region's manufacturers, especially the steel industry, found it harder to compete, which led to employee layoffs. In 1972, the closure of Page Steel and Wire Company was a major setback to the city. A far greater blow to Monessen occurred when its largest employer, Wheeling-Pittsburgh Steel, closed nearly all its Monessen operations in 1986. The company's rail mill did not close until March 1987. The mill's closure marked the end of an era in Monessen's history.

Monessen is currently trying to revitalize itself. The city has made efforts for several years to clean up abandoned properties in hopes of revitalizing the city. In January 2010 the first female mayor, Mary Jo Smith, was sworn in at the Monessen Municipal Building. Older residents know the steel mills will not be returning to the area. Younger residents barely remember the mills or are even unaware of the city's industrial past. "I remember when they tore the blast furnaces down" in the mid-1990s, said one resident. "It was a big deal. My dad took me. I was 5."

The Charleroi-Monessen Bridge was built in 1906 and demolished in 2011. It was listed on the National Register of Historic Places in 1988 and has yet to be removed from the register.

Geography
Monessen is located at  (40.154271, -79.882779).

Monessen is part of the Greater Pittsburgh metropolitan statistical area.

Climate
The climate in this area is characterized by hot, humid summers and generally mild to cool winters.    According to the Köppen Climate Classification system, Monessen has a humid continental climate, abbreviated "Cfa" on climate maps.

Surrounding and adjacent neighborhoods
Monessen's only land border is with Rostraver Township.  Across the Monongahela River in Washington County, Monessen runs adjacent to Carroll and Fallowfield Townships and North Charleroi (with a direct connector via Charleroi-Monessen Bridge).

Demographics

As of the census of 2000, there were 8,669 people, 3,916 households, and 2,451 families residing in the city. The population density was 2,986.8 people per square mile (1,154.2/km2). There were 4,468 housing units at an average density of 1,539.4 per square mile (594.9/km2). The racial makeup of the city was 83.71% White, 13.99% African American, 0.09% Native American, 0.23% Asian, 0.01% Pacific Islander, 0.33% from other races, and 1.63% from two or more races. Hispanic or Latino people of any race were 0.82% of the population. 27.9% were of Italian, 8.4% Slovak, 7.5% German and 7.0% Polish ancestry according to Census 2000.

There were 3,916 households, out of which 21.2% had children under the age of 18 living with them, 42.9% were married couples living together, 15.2% had a female householder with no husband present, and 37.4% were non-families. 34.3% of all households were made up of individuals, and 22.2% had someone living alone who was 65 years of age or older. The average household size was 2.19 and the average family size was 2.80.

In the city, the population was spread out, with 19.6% under the age of 18, 5.3% from 18 to 24, 23.3% from 25 to 44, 22.7% from 45 to 64, and 29.1% who were 65 years of age or older. The median age was 46 years. For every 100 females, there were 84.8 males. For every 100 females age 18 and over, there were 79.0 males.

The median income for a household in the city was $26,686, and the median income for a family was $37,269. Males had a median income of $34,773 versus $21,508 for females. The per capita income for the city was $16,627. About 11.5% of families and 15.7% of the population were below the poverty line, including 27.7% of those under age 18 and 8.2% of those age 65 or over.

Education
Douglas Education Center is a private, for profit higher education career school, located in Monessen.
Monessen City School District is a public school district in Westmoreland County, Pennsylvania.

Notable people 
 Christian B. Anfinsen (1916-1995), biochemist; recipient of Nobel Prize in Chemistry in 1972 for his pioneering study into the structure of ribonuclease; author of Anfinsen's Dogma
 Steve Belichick (1919-2005), NFL player and college coach, including 33-year tenure as assistant and scout at Navy
 Tony Benjamin (1955-), football player
 Eric Crabtree (1944-), NFL Football Player for the Denver Broncos, Cincinnati Bengals, and New England Patriots
 Doug Crusan (1946-), NFL Football Player for the Miami Dolphins
 Artis Leon Ivey Jr. (1963-2022), Grammy Award winning rapper, actor, producer known as Coolio.
 Philander C. Knox (1852-1921) United States Senator, Brownsville, Pennsylvania native, one of several founders of the City of Monessen
 Albert Lexie, shoeshiner known for donating one third of his lifetime salary to charity 
 Bill Malinchak (1944-), former football wide receiver and special teams ace in the National Football League in the 1960s and 1970s
 Frances McDormand, Oscar-winning American actress
 Herman Mihalich (1930-1997), former Democratic member of the Pennsylvania House of Representatives
 Michael Moorer, former heavyweight boxer; boxing champion
 Armand Niccolai (1911-1988), former NFL player for the Pittsburgh Pirates/Steelers
 Lawrence T. Persico, Bishop of the Roman Catholic Diocese of Erie
 James H. Reed (1853-1927), Allegheny, Pennsylvania native, United States federal judge, lawyer, founder of Reed Smith law firm, one of several founders of the City of Monessen
 Tom Savini, makeup artist
 James M. Schoonmaker (1842-1927) Pittsburgh native, American Civil War Colonel, vice-president of the Pittsburgh and Lake Erie Railroad, one of several founders of the City of Monessen
 Blanche Thebom, mezzo-soprano singer

References

External links

 

Cities in Westmoreland County, Pennsylvania
Pittsburgh metropolitan area
Cities in Pennsylvania
Pennsylvania populated places on the Monongahela River
Populated places established in 1897